Following is a list of caves in Bosnia and Herzegovina. Most of the country's caves belong to Dinaric Alps system and are karst caves, with complex karstic features and endemic biodiversity.

See also
List of karst springs in Bosnia and Herzegovina

References 

 
 
 
c
 
Bosnia and Herzegovina